Sterling EQ is an all-woman Classical crossover group from South Africa.  Sterling EQ won a South African Music Award (SAMA) in 2011, becoming only the second girl band to do so.

History

Sterling EQ was formed in 2007, and is led by flutist Carina Bruwer, who is also an ex-professional open water swimmer, who holds some South African and international records.  Other members changed between 2007 and 2009, until the release of Sterling EQ's debut album, Nova (produced by South African Kwaito producer Gabi Le Roux), when the quartet's line-up settled, with Bruwer on flute, Eriel Huang on violin, Magdalene Minnaar on viola and Ariella Caira on cello.  In 2010 the band self-released their debut live DVD "Sterling EQ Live in Concert", which won them the SAMA Award in 2011.  Minnaar left the band in pursue of a singing career in 2010. She was replaced in 2010 by Renate Riedemann.  Sterling EQ's 2nd studio album, Sterling Speel Afrikaans, was released in October 2010.  This was a concept album, consisting of instrumental versions of Afrikaans songs.  In September 2011, Sterling EQ signed a record deal with EMI South Africa, and during March 2012, it was announced that EMI would release their 3rd studio album in August 2012.  In March 2013, the group announced on their Facebook page, that Riedemann would be leaving the group and that the band would continue as a three-piece.  In August 2013, South African violinist Luca Hart joined the group when Huang relocated to Boston.

They featured as special guest stars on the semi-finals of Season 7 of SA Pop Idols in 2011.

Discography

 Pulse (Audio CD, 2012)
	Pulse
	Sarabande
	Carnaval
	Arabesque
	Mumbai Theme
	Chimera
	Asturias
	Genesis
	Khulu’s Groove
	Crane’s Crying
	O Fortuna
 	Mission Impossible
 	Bravo
 Sterling EQ Live in Concert (Live DVD, 2010)
	Electric storm
	Badinirie
	Spring
	Bach’s kitten at play
	Reel around the sun
	Caruso
	Spain
	Theme from caravans
	Beethoven’s fifth
	Nkalakatha
	Toccata & fugue
	Nova
	Bombay crush
	Mundian to bach ke (Emo adams)
	Czardas
	Tango fatale
	Storm
	Sway
	Mbube
 Sterling Speel Afrikaans (Audio CD, 2010)
 Nova (Audio CD, 2009)

Awards and nominations

 South African Music Award (SAMA) 2011 for Sterling EQ Live in Concert (Live DVD)
 Ghoema Music Award 2013 for Pulse
 Huisgenoot Tempo Award 2013 for Pulse
 SAMA nominations for Nova, Sterling Speel Afrikaans
 Tempo Award nomination for Sterling Speel Afrikaans

References

External links
 Sterling EQ's official website

All-female bands
Crossover (music)
South African musical groups
Musical groups established in 2007
Women in South Africa